Lionel Paul Hebert (January 20, 1928 – December 30, 2000) was an American professional golfer. He won five times on the PGA Tour, including the PGA Championship in 1957, the last edition held at match play. His older brother Jay won the same event at stroke play in 1960. Lionel also played on the Ryder Cup team in 1957. An ethnic Cajun from Louisiana, he was born and died in Lafayette.

Professional wins (5)

PGA Tour wins (5)

PGA Tour playoff record (1–1)

Major championships

Wins (1)

Note: The PGA Championship was match play until 1958

Results timeline

CUT = missed the half-way cut
WD = withdrew
R64, R32, R16, QF, SF = Round in which player lost in PGA Championship match play
"T" = tied

Summary

 Most consecutive cuts made – 8 ('58 PGA – '61 Masters)
 Longest streak of top-10s – 2 ('56 PGA & '57 PGA)

U.S. national team appearances
Ryder Cup: 1957

See also
 List of golfers with most PGA Tour wins
 List of men's major championships winning golfers

References

External links
 Louisiana Sports Hall of Fame – Lionel Hebert
 

American male golfers
LSU Tigers golfers
PGA Tour golfers
Ryder Cup competitors for the United States
Winners of men's major golf championships
Golfers from Louisiana
University of Louisiana at Lafayette alumni
Cajun people
Sportspeople from Lafayette, Louisiana
1928 births
2000 deaths